Markovsky is a rural locality (a village) in Podlesnensky Selsoviet, Sterlitamaksky District, Bashkortostan, Russia. The population was 1 as of 2010. There are 2 streets.

Geography 
Markovsky is located 31 km north of Sterlitamak (the district's administrative centre) by road. Strelkovka is the nearest rural locality.

References 

Rural localities in Sterlitamaksky District